Owston and Newbold is a civil parish,  west of Oakham in the Harborough district, in the county of Leicestershire, England. The population of the civil parish at the 2011 census (including Marefield) was 112.

The Parish Church of St Andrew, Owston, began as an Augustinian monastic foundation before 1161, and substantial buildings stood around the site of the current church. Owston Abbey was never prosperous, and when dissolved at the reformation had 6 canons. The parish retained a part of the Abbey Church for its use when the rest was demolished, resulting in an unusually proportioned building, with its doorway through the tower on the south side. The relationship between the current church and former monastic arrangements remains uncertain.

References

External links

Photograph of Owston
History
Ordnance Survey Map of Village from multimap
Parish Profile 2001 Census
Photographs of village from Geograph

Civil parishes in Harborough District